Gurak-e Khvorshidi (also Romanized as Gūrak-e Khvorshīdī; also known as Khorshīdī, Khowrshīdī, and Khvorshīdī) is a village in Delvar Rural District, Delvar District, Tangestan County, Bushehr Province, Iran. At the 2006 census, its population was 654, in 147 families.

References 

Populated places in Tangestan County